Finn Fuglestad (born 22 August 1942 in Stavanger) is a Norwegian historian.

He became an associate professor (førsteamanuensis) at the University of Oslo in 1984, and moved up the ranks to become professor in 1991.

Selected bibliography
A history of Niger 1850-1960, 1983.
Norwegian Missions in African History. Vol.2 Madagascar, 1986.
Spansk historie : et riss, Åsmund Egge and Finn Fuglestad (ed.), 1990. 
En ny verden: Omkring Columbus, with Jens Erland Braarvig, 1993.Latin-Amerika og Karibiens historie, 1994.Fra Svartedauden til Wiener-kongressen. Den vesterlandske kulturkretsens historie 1347-1815 i et globalt-sammenliknende perspektiv, 1999.Spanias og Portugals historie. En oversikt, 2004.The Ambiguities of History: The problem of Ethnocentrism in Historical Writings'', 2005.

References
University of Oslo
List of publications in FRIDA

1942 births
Living people
20th-century Norwegian historians
Academic staff of the University of Oslo
21st-century Norwegian historians